Glencarse is a village in the Scottish council area of Perth and Kinross.

It was formerly served by Glencarse railway station on the Caledonian Railway.

John Murray, a former  Provost of St Mary's Cathedral, Glasgow  was the incumbent of the Scottish Episcopal Church’s All Saints Church in the village from 1959 to 1970.

References

Villages in Perth and Kinross